The Kansas Jayhawk Community College Conference (KJCCC) is a college athletic conference that is a member of the National Junior College Athletic Association (NJCAA). As of 2007, the KJCCC was home to more than 3,000 student-athletes in the 19 men's and women's sports. The conference's name comes from "Jayhawk" which is a term used for people born in the state of Kansas, where all of the conference's schools are located. The term Jayhawk, however, originated with a group of guerrillas during the American Civil War.

Member schools

Current members
The KJCCC currently has 21 full members, all are public schools. All KJCCC schools compete in Division I football, wrestling, track and field and cross country. Hesston is the only member that competes in Division II baseball. Independence is the only member that does not field a baseball team:

Notes

Former affiliate members
The KJCCC had one former affiliate member, which was also a private school:

Notes

Football
Only seven of the schools have football: Butler, Coffeyville, Dodge City, Garden City, Hutchinson, Highland, and Independence. The conference is not divided into divisions for football. Fort Scott terminated its football program on Nov. 8, 2021.

From 2000 through the 2013 season, the regular-season champion was considered the Jayhawk Conference champion while the playoff champion was considered the Region VI champion. Prior to the 2014 season, the playoffs were eliminated from the schedule so that each Jayhawk Conference team could play a game versus each football-playing school in Iowa. The Jayhawk Conference regular-season champion is now also the Region 6 champion.

The Independence Pirates football team was featured on the third and fourth seasons of the television documentary "Last Chance U" and consequently multiple games of the conference were featured on the documentary.

See also 
 List of college athletic programs in Kansas

References

External links 

NJCAA conferences
College sports in Kansas